Harry Lee Colon (born February 14, 1969 in Kansas City, Kansas) is a former American football defensive back in the National Football League (NFL). After playing college football at Missouri, Colon was drafted by the New England Patriots in the 8th round (196th overall) of the 1991 NFL Draft. He played in the NFL for 6 years, playing for the New England Patriots (1991), the Detroit Lions (1992–1994, 1997), and the Jacksonville Jaguars (1995).  He was selected by the Jacksonville Jaguars in the 1995 NFL expansion draft. He had to retire during the 1997 season due to a condition in his neck.

He now resides in Houston, Texas where he is as head coach of the football team and head of the athletics department at John H. Reagan High School.

References

1969 births
Living people
Sportspeople from Kansas City, Kansas
Players of American football from Kansas
American football cornerbacks
American football safeties
Missouri Tigers football players
New England Patriots players
Detroit Lions players
Jacksonville Jaguars players